Bachharan is a village in located in Chitrakoot district (Uttar Pradesh, India).

References

Villages in Chitrakoot district